Harveyella is a genus of red algae belonging to the family Rhodomelaceae.

The species of this genus are found in Europe and Northern America. It is a parasitic red alga, and is generally colourless.

References

Florideophyceae
Red algae genera